Coin is an extinct town in eastern Oregon County, in the U.S. state of Missouri. The village site was located in Bat Cave Hollow along the current Missouri Route FF.

A post office called Coin was established in 1895, and remained in operation until 1909. The community has the name of Coin Jones, an early settler.

References

Ghost towns in Missouri
Former populated places in Oregon County, Missouri